Jamie Russell (born 23 April 1952) is a Canadian basketball player. He competed in the men's tournament at the 1976 Summer Olympics.

References

External links
 

1952 births
Living people
Basketball people from Ontario
Basketball players at the 1976 Summer Olympics
Canadian expatriate basketball people in the United States
Canadian men's basketball players
1974 FIBA World Championship players
1978 FIBA World Championship players
Colgate Raiders men's basketball players
Olympic basketball players of Canada
Sportspeople from Niagara Falls, Ontario
Waterloo Warriors men's basketball players